Edwin Booth Price (January 12, 1909 – March 1, 1976) was an American football, basketball, and baseball player and coach of football.  He served as the head football coach at the University of Texas at Austin from 1951 to 1956, compiling a record of 33–27–1.  After Blair Cherry's abrupt resignation, Price was promoted to head coach.  In his first three seasons, Price carried over the success of Dana X. Bible and Cherry, leading the Longhorns to three winning seasons and two Southwest Conference titles.  In 1954, Texas went 4–5–1, its first losing season in 15 years.  After capping off three losing seasons in a row with a 1–9 season, the worst record in school history, Price tendered his resignation in 1956.  He stayed on at Texas, first in the physical education department and later as assistant dean of students. Price died on March 1, 1976, at his home in Austin, Texas.

Head coaching record

References

External links
 

1909 births
1976 deaths
American men's basketball players
Texas Longhorns baseball players
Texas Longhorns football coaches
Texas Longhorns football players
Texas Longhorns men's basketball players
High school football coaches in Texas
People from Brownwood, Texas
People from Navarro County, Texas
Players of American football from Texas
Baseball players from Texas
Basketball players from Texas